Marguerite Ledoux (7 February 1906 – 17 October 1963) was a French freestyle swimmer. She competed in three events at the 1928 Summer Olympics.

References

External links
 

1906 births
1963 deaths
French female freestyle swimmers
Olympic swimmers of France
Swimmers at the 1928 Summer Olympics
Place of birth missing